Litwar is an unincorporated community in McDowell County, West Virginia, United States.

The community's name most likely was derived from nearby Little War Creek.

The town is on the Norfolk Southern Railway (former Norfolk and Western) network.

References

Unincorporated communities in McDowell County, West Virginia
Unincorporated communities in West Virginia